"Wild" is a song by British rapper MoStack. Following its premiere as BBC Radio 1 DJ Jack Saunders' Hottest Record, it was released as the lead single from MoStack's debut studio album Stacko through Virgin EMI on 2 May 2019; where it peaked at number 41 on the UK Singles Chart. The song was written by Montell Daley, Amish Dilipkumar Patel, and Lionel Richie, and produced by ADP. The song samples "Easy" by Commodores (written by Lionel Richie).

Track listing

Charts

References

2019 singles
2019 songs
MoStack songs
Songs written by Lionel Richie
Songs written by MoStack